In physical cosmology, the Alpher–Bethe–Gamow paper, or αβγ paper, was created by Ralph Alpher, then a physics PhD student, his advisor George Gamow and Hans Bethe. The work, which would become the subject of Alpher's PhD dissertation, argued that the Big Bang would create hydrogen, helium and heavier elements in the correct proportions to explain their abundance in the early universe. While the original theory neglected a number of processes important to the formation of heavy elements, subsequent developments showed that Big Bang nucleosynthesis is consistent with the observed constraints on all primordial elements.

Formally titled "The Origin of Chemical Elements", it was published in the April 1948 issue of Physical Review.

Bethe's name 
Gamow humorously decided to add the name of his friend—the eminent physicist Hans Bethe—to this paper in order to create the whimsical author list of Alpher, Bethe, Gamow, a play on the Greek letters α, β, and γ (alpha, beta, gamma). Bethe was listed in the article as "H. Bethe, Cornell University, Ithaca, New York". In his 1952 book The Creation of the Universe, Gamow explained Hans Bethe's association with the theory thus:

After this, Bethe did work on Big Bang nucleosynthesis.

Alpher, at the time only a graduate student, was generally dismayed by the inclusion of Bethe's name on this paper. He felt that the inclusion of another eminent physicist would overshadow his personal contribution to this work and prevent him from receiving proper recognition for such an important discovery. He expressed resentment over Gamow's whimsy as late as 1999.

Main shortcoming of the theory 
The theory originally proposed that all atomic nuclei are produced by the successive capture of neutrons, one mass unit at a time. However, later study challenged the universality of the successive-capture theory. No element was found to have a stable isotope with an atomic mass of five or eight. Physicists soon noticed that these mass gaps would hinder the production of elements beyond helium. Just as it's impossible to climb a staircase one step at a time when one of the steps is missing, this discovery meant that the successive-capture theory could not account for higher elements.

It was eventually recognized that most of the heavy elements observed in the present universe are the result of stellar nucleosynthesis in stars, a theory first suggested by Arthur Stanley Eddington, given credence by Hans Bethe, and quantitatively developed by Fred Hoyle and a number of other scientists.

However, the Alpher–Bethe–Gamow theory does correctly explain the relative abundances of the isotopes of hydrogen and helium. Taken together, these account for more than 99% of the baryonic mass of the universe. Today, nucleosynthesis is widely considered to have taken place in two stages: formation of hydrogen and helium according to the Alpher–Bethe–Gamow theory, and stellar nucleosynthesis of higher elements according to Bethe and Hoyle's later theories.

Notes

References 
 
 
  This paper is known by the initials of the authors' surnames, B2FH.
 
 
  As quoted in Quark Soup.

External links 
 

Physics papers
Physical cosmology
Works originally published in American magazines
1948 documents
Works originally published in science and technology magazines